Ahmad Iravani is an Iranian-American clergyman from the northern region of Iran, along the Caspian Sea. He is an advocate of the interfaith and intra-faith peace dialogue. On July 12, 2021, he was convicted of wire fraud by the United States District Court for the District of Columbia under United States v. IRAVANI (1:21-cr-00688).

Missionary work
In 1982, following the call of Grand Ayatollah Montazeri to preach Islam around the world, he traveled to Africa. During his stay, Iravani worked to promote intra-faith dialogue amongst Muslims and educate them by holding conferences and giving lectures on fighting Islamic fundamentalist ideas, which were spread throughout Africa at the time. During his time in West Africa, he established an Islamic seminary in Accra, Ghana in 1983.

During the summers of 1983 to 1987, he traveled to other West African countries for missionary work. He then settled in Zimbabwe from 1987 to 1990 and established the Center of Islamic Studies in Southern Africa.

Interfaith work
In 1999, he met a philosopher and scholar, Father McLean, a professor at the Catholic University of America in Washington, D.C. With McLean's assistance, Iravani moved to the United States to pursue his Ph.D. in Western Philosophy in 2000. Soon after, he was asked to teach Islamic Law and Islamic Jurisprudence at the Columbus School of Law and School of Theology. Since 2002, Iravani has been teaching "Introduction to Islam" and "Iran Since the Revolution" during summers at the University of California, Davis. In addition to his academic activities, he has participated in interfaith dialogues in several countries.

He was the Director of Islamic Studies and Dialogue at the Center for the Study of Culture and Values until the end of 2009, which holds conferences and exchanges of scholars between Iran and the United States. In 2010, he founded the Center for the Study of Islam and the Middle East (CSIME) and serves as the President and executive director.

In December 2010, he received his Doctor of Philosophy after defending his Ph.D. dissertation under the title of "Foundations of Jacques Maritain’s Political Philosophy" at the Iranian Institute of Philosophy  in Tehran, Iran.

Iravani became a fellow at the Institute for Policy Research (IPR) at the Catholic University of America in 2014. The same year, he became a member of the Global Agenda Council on the Role of Faith for the year 2014–2016, as part of the World Economic Forum

In 2014, Iravani was invited to attend the World Economic Forum in Davos, Switzerland, where he delivered a speech on interfaith endeavors. In 2015, he participated in the Davos Insights on Society and Security panel. Iravani was also involved with the "Global Sharpers" talk show in discussions on how to engage youth in work. While at the World Economic Forum, Dr. Iravani was invited by Karen I. Tse, founder of International Bridges to Justice and a human rights attorney, to speak on torture at her 2015 Sunrise Interfaith Peace Vigil.

Criminal conviction 
On July 12, 2021, a criminal complaint was filed against Ahmad Iravani before United States District Court for the District of Columbia United States vs. IRAVANI (1:21-mj-00522-RMM) for defrauding several nonprofit organizations through fraudulent travel arrangements, between October 2016 to March 2019, and on November 29, 2021, Iravani agreed to admit guilt and entered a plea of guilt to the information and was convicted of wire fraud in violation of Title 18, United States Code, Section 1343, by the United States District Court for the District of Columbia under United States vs. IRAVANI (1:21-mj-00688-RDM), and sentenced to 36 months of probation and restitution of $50,657.06.

Notes

External links
Center for the Study of Islam and the Middle East
 https://web.archive.org/web/20100917175629/http://www.missouristate.edu/aime/32842.htm
 https://www.courtlistener.com/docket/61562340/united-states-v-iravani/

Iranian emigrants to the United States
University of Tehran alumni
Catholic University of America faculty
21st-century Muslim scholars of Islam
Living people
Year of birth missing (living people)